Tan Min (born 25 August 1972) is a former synchronized swimmer from China. She competed in both the 1988 and 1992 Summer Olympics.

References 

1972 births
Living people
Chinese synchronized swimmers
Olympic synchronized swimmers of China
Synchronized swimmers at the 1988 Summer Olympics
Synchronized swimmers at the 1992 Summer Olympics
Synchronized swimmers from Chongqing
Synchronized swimmers at the 1991 World Aquatics Championships